Norfolk Constabulary is the territorial police force responsible for policing Norfolk in East Anglia, England. Headquartered in Wymondham, Norfolk is responsible for the City of Norwich, along with King's Lynn, Great Yarmouth and Thetford. As of September 2022, the force has a strength of 1,921 police constables, and as of March 2022, 179 special constables, 1,226 police staff/designated officers, and 100 police support volunteers. The chief constable is currently Paul Sanford, and the police and crime commissioner is Giles Orpen-Smellie (Conservative).

Organisation 
Norfolk Constabulary is responsible for policing Norfolk's four major settlements, the City of Norwich, King's Lynn, Great Yarmouth and Thetford, along with the Brecklands, the Broadlands and North Norfolk.

It is also responsible for Norfolk's  of coastline, along with 16 rivers, including  of navigable waters in The Broads.

RAF Marham, one of the Royal Air Force's Main Operating Bases and home to the F-35 Stealth Fighters, is based in Norfolk.

Sandringham Estate 
Norfolk Constabulary has a responsibility for policing and security (through its own Royalty Protection Unit) of the Sandringham Estate, one of only two personal/private residences owned directly by The Royal Family.

Eastern Region Special Operations Unit 
Created in 2010, ERSOU is funded by the seven police forces that make up the eastern region, with Bedfordshire Police being the lead force. It is primarily responsible for the combined Regional Organised Crime Unit and Counter Terrorism Policing.

Collaboration

Norfolk & Suffolk collaboration 
Norfolk Constabulary and Suffolk Constabulary, the force bordering to the south, have collaborated numerous services together since 2010. An extensive programme of collaborative work has already delivered a number of joint units and departments in areas such as Major Investigations, Protective Services, Custody, Transport, HR, Finance and ICT. Around £16 million has been saved by pooling resources with Suffolk.

7 Force / Eastern Region collaboration 
The 7 Force Collaboration Programme includes Bedfordshire, Cambridgeshire, Hertfordshire, Norfolk, Suffolk, Essex and Kent police forces.  This strategic collaboration programme was established in 2015 to develop and implement successful collaborative solutions to protect the frontline local delivery of policing. It collaborates on areas including Procurement, Training, Firearms, Driver Management, Digital Assets, Vetting and Forensics, along with ERSOU.

Norfolk Fire & Rescue Service collaboration 
2015 and 2016 respectively saw the relocation of the fire and rescue analysts team and senior management team to Norfolk Constabulary's Operations and Communications Centre (OCC) in Wymondham. This was followed in 2019 with emergency operators from Norfolk Fire and Rescue Service being co-located within the Contact & Control Room (CCR) at OCC.

History

19th and 20th centuries
Norfolk Constabulary was founded in 1839 under the County Police Act 1839, and was one of the first county forces to be formed.

In 1965, it had an establishment of 636 officers and an actual strength of 529. In 1968 it amalgamated with Norwich City Police and Great Yarmouth Borough Police to form the Norfolk Joint Constabulary. In 1974, it returned to the present name Norfolk Constabulary.

21st century

In March 2006, proposals were made by the Home Secretary which would see the force merge with neighbouring forces Cambridgeshire Constabulary and Suffolk Constabulary to form a strategic police force for East Anglia. The Norfolk Police Authority was enthusiastic for the merger, but the neighbouring forces were not. With the announcement in July 2006 by the Home Office that the principle of merger was under review, the Norfolk Constabulary announced their intention to recruit a permanent Chief Constable, a process that they had delayed while merger was likely.

In 2008, the force changed uniforms to black combat style trousers with a polo shirt but reverted to the more traditional white shirt and tie on a trial basis in November 2012. It has since reverted to the polo shirt.

In 2018, Norfolk abolished its use of PCSOs and made all of its remaining PCSOs redundant. It became the first police force in England to do this. The loss of PCSOs had allowed Norfolk Police to recruit 97 new staff, including 81 police officers. A 5.5pc rise in the police precept of council tax led to a further 17 police officers and six staff being hired.

2019 saw the UK Prime Minister announce that 20,000 new police officers would be recruited as part of a national uplift programme. Norfolk had been allocated 224 of those new officers.

2020/2021 saw almost half of all new Police Officer recruits being female. Since the Government uplift programme began, Norfolk had recruited 211 additional officers as of May 2022, bringing the force strength up to 1,888 police officers.

In 2022, Norfolk begun training recruits under the new Police Education Qualifications Framework (PEQF) from its new training centre at Hethersett Old Hall, which sees a partnership of training with Anglia Ruskin University.

Chief constables
1909–1915 : Major Egbert Napier
1915–1928 : Captain J.H. Mander (https://norfolk.spydus.co.uk/cgi-bin/spydus.exe/FULL/WPAC/BIBENQ/55706609/30963807,1?FMT=IMG)
1928–1956 : Captain Stephen Hugh Van Neck
1965–1974 : (Frederick) Peter Collison Garland
1975-1980 : Gordon Taylor
1981–1990 : George Charlton
1990–1993 : Peter James Ryan
1993–2002 : Ken Williams
2002–2005 : Andrew Christopher Hayman
2005–2006 : Carole Howlett (acting)
2006–2009 : Ian McPherson
2010–2013 : Philip Gormley
2013–2021 : Simon Bailey
2021–present : Paul Sanford

Officers killed in the line of duty

The Police Roll of Honour Trust and Police Memorial Trust list and commemorate all British police officers killed in the line of duty. Since its establishment in 1984, the Police Memorial Trust has erected 50 memorials nationally to some of those officers.

The following officers of Norfolk Constabulary are just two of those from the force that have been killed in the line of duty:
PC Charles William Alger, 1909 (shot)
PC Robert Craig Orr McLaren, 1981 (his vehicle crashed during a police pursuit)

Governance and budget
Since 2021, the force has been overseen by military veteran Giles Orpen-Smellie (Conservative) who is the Norfolk Police and Crime Commissioner. Since 2021, the Chief Constable is Paul Sanford.

Norfolk Constabulary's Budget for 2022/2023 is £193.7million, a rise of £10.6million from the previous year.

See also
Norfolk Police and Crime Commissioner
Law enforcement in the United Kingdom
Table of police forces in the United Kingdom

References

Bibliography
 A Movable Rambling Police: An Official History of Policing in Norfolk, by Brian David Butcher published by the Norfolk Constabulary and printed in King's Lynn in 1989 no ISBN

External links

 Norfolk Constabulary at HMICFRS

Organisations based in Norfolk
Police forces of England
Government agencies established in 1839
1839 establishments in England
Wymondham, Norfolk